Edward Payne may refer to:

 Edward Payne (banker), governor of the Bank of England, 1771–1773
 Edward John Payne (1844–1904), English barrister and historian
 Edward Howard Payne (1849–1908), businessman from Missouri; benefactor and namesake of Howard Payne University, Brownwood, Texas

See also
 Eddie N. Payne (1873–1951), member of the Louisiana House of Representatives
 Eddie Payne (1951–2021), American college basketball coach